In Serbian epic poetry, Toplica Milan (or Milan Toplica), also known as Milan from Toplica, was a Serbian knight who died during the historical Battle of Kosovo in 1389.

According to folk songs, he was born in the Toplica region and was a sworn brother (in Serbian: побратим / pobratim) to Miloš Obilić and Ivan Kosančić, and had before the battle promised himself to a girl, the Kosovo Maiden. After the battle, she found Pavle Orlović and heard about the fate of Milan and his sworn brothers, according to a Serbian epic poem recorded and published in the early 19th century by Vuk Karadžić. Honours and titles attributed to him, differ from area to area, with the folk songs recorded by Karadžić calling him a duke. In the cycle of Marko Kraljević he is known to hold the title of bajraktar, while Obilić is a vojvode and Kosančić a privenac. In folklore, the character is usually portrayed as an expert marksman and the most skilled archer in the army of Prince Lazar, thus he is often visually depicted as carrying a bow and arrows. He is also often characterised as being exceptionally tall. In Kosovo mythos, his character is modeled after the historical group of 12 unnamed Christian knights who penetrated the Turkish camp and killed the Ottoman sultan. Some legends depict him as a knight who entered the Murad's tent along with Obilić, thus participating in the slaughter of the sultans suite amidst the shock of the assassination. Others portray him as standing guard outside the tent along with Kosančić. In the aftermath, the trio attempts to escape in vain, wreaking havoc among the Turkish forces in the process. Toplica is so mighty that along the path where he forces his way ...a chariot can pass afterwards. However, he is the first of the three to fall to the enemy blades. 

Medieval Berkovac, near Valjevo, is commonly called Zamak Toplice Milana.

The Topličin Venac Crescent in Belgrade is named after Milan Toplica.

See also
 General Vuča

References

Serbian knights
Characters in Serbian epic poetry